The Jinan Yellow River Bridge, also known as the Jinan Yellow River Highway Bridge, is a cable-stayed road bridge across the Yellow River in the city of Jinan, Shandong 
Province, China.

The national State Planning Commission authorized the plan to construct the Jinan Yellow River bridge on December 10, 1977. In February 1978, engineers Li Shou and Wan Shanshan from the Communication Planning and Design Institute of Shandong Province started to work on the design. In September of the same year, the preliminary design was approved by the Shandong Province construction committee. Test boring at the construction site commenced in July 1978. Work on the bridge proper started officially on December 15, 1978, the bridge assembly was in place by December 1981, and construction was completed on June 30, 1982. Work was carried out by the Communication Engineering Company of Shandong Province. It was supervised by assistant directors Song Ren and Wang Liang as well as assistant commissioner Du Henggan from the department of transportation. The bridge was opened to traffic on July 14, 1982. It was one of the first long-span cable-stayed road bridges in China. The total construction cost was 35,180,000 Yuan RMB. 
By 1990, the daily average traffic volume had reached 14,179 vehicles (for a 24hour period).

The bridge design has a semi-fan arrangement with steel cables and reinforced concrete H-pylons. The bridge has a total of five spans with the lengths:  -  -  -  - . The pylons are 68.4 metres tall.

See also
List of sites in Jinan

References

Bridges in Shandong
Bridges completed in 1982
Toll bridges in China
1982 establishments in China
Bridges over the Yellow River